Don Arden (born Harry Levy; 4 January 1926 – 21 July 2007) was an English music manager, agent, and businessman.  He managed the careers of rock acts such as Jerry Lee Lewis, Little Richard, Air Supply, Small Faces, The Move, Black Sabbath and Electric Light Orchestra.

Arden gained a reputation in Britain for his aggressive, sometimes illegal business tactics, which led to his being called "Mr Big", the "English Godfather" and the "Al Capone of Pop". His success story turned sour when his violent 'negotiating' methods and questionable accounting caught up with him, and he became estranged from members of his own family.

He was married to Hope Shaw, a former ballet dancer/teacher, who died in 1999. He was the father of David Levy and Sharon Osbourne.

Early life and career 
Born into a Jewish family in Cheetham Hill, Manchester. Arden began his show business career when he was just 13 years old as a singer and stand-up comic after briefly attending the Royal College of Music and in 1944 changed his name from Harry Levy to Don Arden. After being demobilised from the British Army at the end of World War II, Arden returned to civilian life to develop his show business career from 1946 to 1953.

Arden worked as an entertainer on the British variety circuit. He impersonated singers such as Enrico Caruso and film actors known for gangster roles, such as Edward G. Robinson and George Raft. On weekends, Yiddish-speaking Arden impressed Jewish audiences with his Al Jolson routine. One of his record releases was his version of "Blue Suede Shoes" on the Embassy label, on which he tried to impersonate Elvis. In 1954, he became a showbiz agent after realising it would be more profitable. He began his career organising Hebrew folk song contests, then started putting together his own shows.

Arden launched his career as a manager when he signed up American rock 'n' roller Gene Vincent in 1960, taking over from John Schatt. Arden could not control Vincent's compulsive alcoholism and the relationship ended when Vincent reportedly pulled a knife on his manager. For a short period of time in the early 1960s, he worked with the British singer Elkie Brooks at the start of her career.

During 1964, Arden moved into beat group pop management with The Nashville Teens, who secured chart hits with "Tobacco Road", "Google Eye" and "Find My Way Back Home". According to Johnny Rogan's book Starmakers & Svengalis, the group's earnings from those hits was £3,513. When group member John Hawken confronted Arden about some confusion over monies to be collected, his manager told him: "I have the strength of 10 men in these hands" and threatened to throw him from an office window.

In 1965, Arden met aspiring rock band Small Faces in his office in Carnaby Street. Half an hour later, he had signed them up. Arden was immediately struck by the potential of Small Faces: "I thought at that time, on the first hearing, I thought it was the best band in the world". Kenney Jones, Small Faces' drummer, said: "He was kind of a Jewish teddy bear I suppose. You liked him immediately because he was enthusiastic and he talked about what he could do and what he couldn't do and whenever he said – 'I'll do this, I'll do that' – he did and it came true." The band's debut single, "Whatcha Gonna Do About It", was ushered into the hit parade by "chart-fixing", which cost Arden £12,000. Arden denied it was cheating: "I had a saying, you can't polish a turd. In other words, if the record's no good to begin with it still won't be any good after you've wasted your time and money getting it played".

Arden's business methods 
In 1966, Arden and a squad of "minders" turned up at impresario Robert Stigwood's office to "teach him a lesson" for daring to discuss a change of management with Small Faces, which became one of the most notorious incidents from the 1960s British pop business. Arden reportedly threatened to throw Stigwood out of the window if he ever interfered with his business again.

The band was never entirely convinced that Arden had paid them everything he owed them. Kenney Jones has mixed memories of the band's stormy relationship with Arden: 

Arden tried to rekindle his former glories as a family entertainer by releasing a single of his own in 1967: "Sunrise Sunset", from the musical Fiddler on the Roof, but it failed to chart. Arden returned to music management in 1968 when he signed The Move. He struck gold when two groups formed by ex-Move members, ELO and Wizzard (1972), started having international hits: Wizzard with "See My Baby Jive" and "Angel Fingers" (1973), and ELO with "10538 Overture" (1972) and "Roll Over Beethoven" (1973). With later albums like Out of the Blue (1977) and Discovery (1979), ELO became a prominent act.

In 1973, Arden took over management of singer-songwriter Lynsey de Paul. In the following year, she provided the first hit on his new Jet label, "No Honestly", which was also the theme tune to a hit ITV comedy No, Honestly. By 1976, Arden was embroiled in a lawsuit with the distraught singer over what she claimed was late payment of money owed to her. De Paul commented:  She eventually reached a settlement with Arden in 1978. He brought his son David and daughter Sharon into the business, intending to build an Arden showbiz dynasty.

Estrangement from Sharon Osbourne and legal problems 
In 1979, one of Arden's successes, Black Sabbath, sacked their vocalist Ozzy Osbourne. Sharon entered into a relationship with Osbourne, and took over his management from her father. Arden was livid. Reportedly, the next time Sharon visited Don, his vicious pet dogs savaged her. She was pregnant at the time and lost the child. Sharon eventually married Osbourne and had no contact with her father for 20 years.

In 1979, investigative reporter Roger Cook used the dispute with Lynsey de Paul to probe into Arden's controversial management style on BBC Radio 4's Checkpoint programme. That proved to be a colourful encounter. "When you fight the champion you go 15 rounds, you've got to be prepared to go the whole way", Arden tells Cook. "I'll take you with one hand strapped up my arse. You're not a man, you're a creep." Arden threatened to break the neck of anyone who talked to Cook in his on-air interview.

From the late 1970s into the early 1980s, Arden enjoyed the high-rolling lifestyle of a top music mogul. In the mid-1980s, he bought Portland Recording Studios (formerly IBC Studios) from Chas Chandler and installed his son David as manager. The studio's equipment was very outdated by that time, and much of the income was being generated by another company known as RadioTracks, which ran half the facility, and by George Peckham (Porky Prime Cuts), a well-known cutting engineer, whose cutting rooms were on the ground floor at the back of the building. Arden had acquired shares in RadioTracks through buying out Chandler without the knowledge of the other directors.

In 1986, Arden was arrested for kidnapping and torturing a Jet records accountant named Harshad Patel, whom Arden believed had been embezzling money.  Arden's son, known legally as 'David Levy', appeared at the Old Bailey in 1986 for his role in the matter. The incident occurred at the offices at 35 Portland Place. Convicted, Levy spent several months in an open prison. Arden, tried separately on related charges, was acquitted.

The drawn-out dispute meant Arden was unable to attend to business, and legal costs proved a fatal strain on Jet Records, which collapsed. Portland Recording Studios were considerably in arrears with rent to the Prudential, which owned the building at Portland Place, close to the BBC's Broadcasting House. Eventually, the Prudential evicted Jet Records.

From 1986 to the mid-1990s, Arden shuttled between his homes in Beverly Hills and Parkside in Wimbledon, London.

Reconciliation with Sharon Osbourne and final years 
In 2001 Sharon Osborne told The Guardian: "The best lesson I ever had was watching him fuck his business up. He taught me everything not to do. My father's never even seen any of my three kids and, as far as I'm concerned, he never will." Later the same year, at Ozzy's insistence, Sharon and Arden finally reconciled, with Arden taking a walk-on role in the successful reality TV show The Osbournes in 2002. He also met his grandchildren Jack and Kelly for the first time on the show, and he met his granddaughter Aimee off-screen.

In August 2004, Sharon Osbourne stated her father had Alzheimer's disease. A "tell all" biography about Arden's life, entitled Mr Big, was published in 2007, shortly before Arden's death in Los Angeles on 21 July 2007. Sharon Osbourne paid for her father's care in the last years of his life. He was buried in Agecroft Jewish Cemetery, Langley Road, Pendlebury, in Salford on 25 July 2007.

On 29 October 2007, a memorial headstone was unveiled at Agecroft by his sister Eileen (Somers), daughter Sharon Osbourne, grandson Jack Osbourne and nephew and niece Danny Somers and Cathy Cowan. One line on the inscription reads: "His beautiful voice will sing in our hearts forever. Shalom". Later in the morning a plaque was unveiled at Higher Crumpsall Synagogue, Cheetham Hill, Manchester, with the addition of the words "It all started here" with a line of musical notes. That refers to the time when Arden, then Harry Levy, sang in the synagogue choir as a very young man.

Carnaby Street plaque 

On 8 September 2007, a commemorative plaque dedicated to Don Arden and Small Faces was unveiled at 52–55 Carnaby Street, London, Arden's former offices. Kenney Jones, ex-drummer of Small Faces, said: "To honour the Small Faces after all these years is a terrific achievement. I only wish that Steve Marriott, Ronnie Lane and the late Don Arden were here to enjoy this moment with me".

References

Further reading 
 Starmakers & Svengalis: The History of British Pop Management – Johnny Rogan, 1988, 
 Mr. Big: Ozzy, Sharon and my life as the godfather of rock – Don Arden & Mick Wall, 2004,

External links 

Don Arden in The Osbourne's FAQ
Don Arden obituary, by Pierre Perrone, in The Independent, 25 July 2007
Don Arden obituary, by Garth Cartwright, in The Guardian, 25 July 2007
Don Arden obituary, in The Times, 24 July 2007

1926 births
2007 deaths
British Army soldiers
English talent agents
Black Sabbath
British Army personnel of World War II
Electric Light Orchestra
Deaths from Alzheimer's disease
Deaths from dementia in California
English Jews
Yiddish-speaking people
English music managers
People from Cheetham Hill
Small Faces
English entertainers
Military personnel from Manchester
20th-century English businesspeople